Daniel 'Dani' Sotres Castañeda (born 21 May 1993) is a Spanish footballer who plays as a goalkeeper.

Club career
Sotres was born in Santiago de Cudeyo, Medio Cudeyo, Cantabria. A product of local Racing de Santander's youth ranks, he made his debut for the first team on 9 April 2012 (one month shy of his 19th birthday), coming off the bench to replace the injured Mario Fernández in a 3–0 La Liga away loss against Málaga CF. He was handed his first start three days later, but his team against lost by the same scoreline, at home to RCD Mallorca, being eventually relegated at the season's end.

Sotres was definitely promoted to Racing's main squad for the 2012–13 campaign, going on to feature in 14 Segunda División games – 15 overall – as they again dropped down a level. On 29 January 2014, with the club immerse in a financial crisis, he moved to Recreativo de Huelva but had to wait until March to start playing.

On 29 July 2015, Sotres was loaned back to his first club Racing for one year, with an option to a permanent three-year deal after the expiration of the loan. On 31 August of the following year he signed for another reserve team, Atlético Levante UD also of the third division.

On 10 July 2017, Sotres agreed to a one-year deal at RC Celta de Vigo, being assigned to the B side still in the third tier. On 28 August of the following year, he joined Salamanca CF UDS of the same league.

Sotres returned to the Spanish top flight on 24 July 2020 after signing for Cádiz CF, but was loaned to third-division side CF Rayo Majadahonda on 24 September of that year. In the summer of 2021, he moved to Cultural y Deportiva Leonesa on a two-year contract.

International career
Sotres won his only cap for Spain at under-21 level on 5 February 2013, replacing Kepa Arrizabalaga at half-time of a 1–1 friendly draw with Belgium.

Career statistics

Club

References

External links

1993 births
Living people
Spanish footballers
Footballers from Cantabria
Association football goalkeepers
La Liga players
Segunda División players
Segunda División B players
Primera Federación players
Tercera División players
Rayo Cantabria players
Racing de Santander players
Recreativo de Huelva players
Atlético Levante UD players
Celta de Vigo B players
Salamanca CF UDS players
Cádiz CF players
CF Rayo Majadahonda players
Cultural Leonesa footballers
Spain youth international footballers
Spain under-21 international footballers